Jake Miller may refer to:

 Jake Miller (pitcher) (1898–1975), pitcher in Major League Baseball
 Jake Miller (outfielder) (1895–1974), outfielder in Major League Baseball
 Jake Miller (singer) (born 1992), American hip hop artist
 Jake Miller, a minor character in Marvel Comics

See also
 Jacob Miller (disambiguation)
 Jake Millar
 Jake Milner
 Jake Muller